Ziti are an extruded pasta, originating in Campania. They are shaped into long, wide tubes, about 25 cm long, that need to be broken by hand into smaller pieces before cooking. Ziti have similarities to bucatini but are much thicker.

Ziti are often stuffed and baked, whereas penne, another tubular pasta but one that is pre-shortened, are sauced or used in pasta salads.

Ziti in the US are most commonly associated with the Italian-American dish of baked ziti although they are also used in pasta alla Norma.

References

Cuisine of Sicily
Types of pasta